Wong Hong-kit (born 30 August 1998; also known as Jack Wong) is a Hongkonger tennis player. His younger sister Cody Wong is also a professional tennis player.

Wong has a career high ATP singles ranking of 653 achieved on 31 December 2018. He also has a career high ATP doubles ranking of 648 achieved on 30 September 2019.

Wong represents Hong Kong at the Davis Cup, where he has a W/L record of 13–5.

ITF Finals

Singles: 1 (0 titles, 1 runner–ups)

Doubles: 7 (1 titles, 6 runner–ups)

References 
 
 
 

1998 births
Living people
Hong Kong male tennis players
Tennis players at the 2018 Asian Games
Asian Games competitors for Hong Kong